Länsi-Pasila is a subdivision of Pasila, Helsinki, Finland.

External links 
 

Pasila